Theodoxus jordani is a species of freshwater snail with an operculum, an aquatic gastropod mollusk in the family Neritidae, the nerites.

Distribution
This species occurs in:
 Turkey
 Syria
 Lebanon
 Lake Kinneret in Israel
 Palestinian territories
 Yarmouk River in Jordan<ref>Amr Z. S & Abu Baker M. (2004). "Freshwater snails of Jordan". 'Denisia 14: 221-227. PDF.</ref>
 Iraq
 Iran

The type locality is the Jordan Basin.

Shells of this species were also found in Üçağızlı Cave in Turkey, in Upper Paleolithic deposits which probably originated from the Orontes River.

Parasites
Parasites of Theodoxus jordani include two types of trematodes.

Predators
Predators of Theodoxus jordani include:
 fishes Barbus longiceps, Blennius fluviatilis crab Potamon potamonFootnotes

References

External links

 Al-Dabbagh K. Y., Khalid Y. & Luka J. Y. (1986). "Population dynamics of the gastropod Theodoxus jordani (Sowerby) in the Shatt Al-Arab River". Freshwater Biology 16: 443–448. .
 Alouf N. J. (1998). "Distribution of Theodoxus jordani (Mollusca: Gastropoda) in Lebanon: biogeographic aspects". Vie Milieu 48: 133–138.
 Al-Dabbagh K. Y. & Luka J. Y. (1986). "Respiration studies and population metabolism of the gastropod Theodoxus jordani (Sowerby)". Freshwater Biology'' 16(4): 449–453.

Neritidae
Gastropods described in 1836
Taxa named by George Brettingham Sowerby I